This is a list of satellites and spacecraft which have been given USA designations by the United States Air Force. These designations have been applied to most United States military satellites since 1984, and replaced the earlier OPS designation.

As of June 2022, USA designations have been assigned to 331 space satellites. There is not always a one-to-one mapping between launch vehicles and mission spacecraft. This can occasionally result in gaps when maintaining records that incorrectly make that assumption, such as the "missing" entries for USA-163 (which are, symmetrically, contemporary with confusion over "splitting" spacecraft tracks).

List

See also 

 List of NRO launches

References

External links 
 Directory of U.S. Military Rockets and Missiles - Satellite Launch List
 Encyclopedia Astronautica

USA
Satellites
 
Military satellites of the United States